Tao Hong (born 15 January 1972) is a Chinese actress and former synchronised swimmer. A National Games of China champion, Tao was part of the Chinese national team at several synchronised swimming competitions from 1987 to 1991, including the 1991 World Aquatics Championships.

As an actress, Tao has received wide acclaim for films like Colors of the Blind (1997) and Forgetting to Know You (2013), though she is better known for hit TV dramas like Sunny Piggy (2000), Nothing in the Mirror (2002), Chuncao (2007) and The Red (2014). Internationally, Tao is probably best known for her small role in the Academy Award-winning film The Red Violin (1998).

Athletic career

Tao Hong began practicing with the Beijing Synchronized Swimming Team in 1983 when she was 11. In 1984, she officially made the team. She made the national team for the first time in 1987.

At the 1991 World Aquatics Championships, China finished 6th, which would remain China's best finish at the event until 2007. Although a member of the national team, Tao missed both the 1988 and the 1992 Olympics, since she was slightly weaker than her teammates Tan Min, Guan Zewen, and Wang Xiaojie at solo and duet competitions, and team competition did not become an Olympic event until 1996 after she retired to pursue acting.

Notable National Competitions

International Competitions

Acting career
In August 1993, Jiang Wen, who had been preparing for his directorial debut In the Heat of the Sun, went to the Beijing Synchronized Swimming Team looking for a good swimmer for his female lead. Even though Tao did not remotely fit the physical description of the role, Jiang liked her smile so much that he invited her to his set for a supporting role. The film was a big hit, and at the suggestion of Jiang, she retired from the Beijing club and applied to 3 professional acting schools: Central Academy of Drama, Beijing Film Academy and Shanghai Theatre Academy, all highly prestigious and selective. She was accepted to all 3 and chose Central Academy of Drama. She was the class president and became the first student in school history (along with classmate Duan Yihong) to receive a perfect grade. In 2015, she participated in the making of a music video of The Hopes of President Xi.

Filmography

Films

Television

Acting Awards and Nominations

Personal life
Tao Hong married actor Xu Zheng in 2002. They first met and became friends in 1999 while co-starring in the wacky romance TV series Sunny Piggy. They have portrayed a married couple in 2 films, Unfinished Girl (2007) and Xu's directorial debut Lost in Thailand (2012). They have also collaborated in the 2002 TV series Sky Lovers (Segment 5, "Sun Tanning") and 2 films in which they did not appear in the same scene: No Lonely Angels (2002) and No Man's Land (2013). In 2005, they starred in the Chinese adaptation of the Broadway comedy Last of the Red Hot Lovers, with Xu playing the would-be adulterer and Tao playing all 3 seductresses. First staged in Beijing, the play caused a sensation, and the couple subsequently performed the play over 30 times in 10 major cities like Shanghai, Chengdu, Nanjing, Xi'an, Zhengzhou, Shenzhen, and Chongqing, receiving overwhelming support everywhere that they canceled their holiday travel plans for more performances. At each city they performed some jokes in the local dialect.

Their daughter was born on 30 December 2008 in Beijing.

Notes

External links

Tao Hong on Sina Weibo

1972 births
Living people
Actresses from Wuxi
20th-century Chinese actresses
21st-century Chinese actresses
Chinese synchronized swimmers
Sportspeople from Wuxi
Chinese stage actresses
Central Academy of Drama alumni
Chinese film actresses
Chinese television actresses
Chinese voice actresses
Synchronized swimmers from Jiangsu
Synchronized swimmers at the 1991 World Aquatics Championships